Bernard Dunn may refer to:
Bernard J. Dunn (1924–2009), American scientist and entrepreneur
Bernie Dunn (1944–2018), Australian politician